Via Cairoli is a street in the historical centre of Genoa, in North-western Italy, named after the 10th Prime Minister of Italy Benedetto Cairoli (1825-1889). Built in the 18th century as “Strada Nuovissima” (Italian for “the most new street”), it is one of the Strade Nuove (Italian for "new streets") inscribed in July 2006 in the list of UNESCO World Heritage Site Genoa: the Strade Nuove and the system of the Palazzi dei Rolli.

History 
Via Cairoli, then known as Strada Nuovissima, was built between 1778 and 1786 by the architect Gregorio Petondi.

During the Reinassance period, the nobility of the Republic of Genoa started a careful town planning to transform the existing medieval city and initiate a sizeable urban expansion to the North. After this expansion, however, the two “Strade Nuove” - the 16th-century Strada Nuova (now via Garibaldi) and the 17th-century Strada Balbi (now via Balbi) – remained without a comparable thoroughfare connecting them, separated by a number of medieval alleys and squares. In the 18th century, therefore, the city decided to improve the connection between the two monumental streets and give a boost to the westward traffic through the construction of Strada Nuovissima. This required sacrificing some ancient working-class homes and adapting some of the aristocratic palaces, such as the Palazzo Lomellini Doria-Lamba, which were located alongside the new street.

Palaces listed as a UNESCO World Heritage Site

See also 
 Genoa: The Strade Nuove and the system of the Palazzi dei Rolli
 Via Garibaldi (Genoa)
 Via Balbi (Genoa)
 Republic of Genoa
 Genoa

Notes

Bibliography 
 “Le Strade Nuove”, Genova, SAGEP Editrice, 1986.
 Giorgio Doria (1995), Nobiltà e investimenti a Genova in Età moderna, Genova
 Gioconda Pomella (2007), Guida Completa ai Palazzi dei Rolli Genova, Genova, De Ferrari Editore()
 Mauro Quercioli (2008), I Palazzi dei Rolli di Genova, Roma, Libreria dello Stato
 Fiorella Caraceni Poleggi (2001), Palazzi Antichi e Moderni di Genova raccolti e disegnati da Pietro Paolo Rubens (1652), Genova, Tormena Editore
 Mario Labò (2003), I palazzi di Genova di P.P. Rubens, Genova, Nuova Editrice Genovese

External links 

  

Buildings and structures in Genoa
Tourist attractions in Genoa